Imal Liyanage can refer to:

 Imal Liyanage (cricketer, born 1977), Sri Lankan cricketer
 Imal Liyanage (cricketer, born 1994), Sri Lankan-born Qatari cricketer